The Sachseln Tunnel is a tunnel in the Swiss canton of Obwalden. It runs to the south-east of the Lake of Sarnen (Sarner See) between Giswil and Sarnen, bypassing the old road along the lake side, and forms part of the A8 motorway.

As the tunnel does not meet modern safety standards, work is being undertaken to uprate it, with the construction of a parallel safety tunnel with cross connections at least every , and the renewal of ventilation and other safety equipment. The work is expected to be completed by 2019.

References 

Buildings and structures in Obwalden
Transport in Obwalden
Road tunnels in Switzerland
Tunnels completed in 1997